Arrive Alive is an unfinished comedy film directed by Jeremiah S. Chechik and starring Willem Dafoe and Joan Cusack. It was produced by Art Linson.

Premise
Mickey Crews is a house detective in a seedy Florida hotel who gets involved in investigating the death of a former champion boxer. He has a romance with a former exotic dancer named Joy.

Background
The script was written by Mitch Glazer and Michael O'Donoghue who had written Scrooged (1988) for producer Art Linson. Linson had tried to get Arrive Alive made for a number of years, with a variety of stars attached, before finally securing funding with Chechik, Dafoe and Cusack. Cusack was an up-and-coming actress, working on Saturday Night Live, Dafoe was getting terrific buzz from The Last Temptation of Christ and Chechik had just directed the successful National Lampoon's Christmas Vacation.

Filming started in April 1990. However, after a week, the producers felt that the lines they had thought so funny in the script were not getting the laughs they hoped for. Shortly after arriving for location shooting in Miami, Dafoe quit due to script changes which required him to perform slapstick comedy which did not suit him. Six days later, the decision was taken to cancel production as no satisfactory replacement could be found for Dafoe and write off the $7 million cost. The whole story is related in Linson's book A Pound of Flesh.

Various attempts have been made to film the script again without any success.

The orca Lolita was to appear in the film but production was halted while filming at the Miami Seaquarium.

References

External links
 

1990s unfinished films
Unreleased American films
1990s comedy films
American comedy films
Films directed by Jeremiah S. Chechik
Films produced by Art Linson
Films set in Florida
Films with screenplays by Michael O'Donoghue
Films with screenplays by Mitch Glazer
1990s English-language films
1990s American films